The RMIT Building 220 is one of the best known suburban educational buildings in Victoria. Designed by the practice of Wood Marsh, the building was built in 1998 as part of the Royal Melbourne Institute of Technology (RMIT) university Bundoora campus. It is part of RMIT's image campaign where the University is set to become more radical towards a new progressive identity. The building is a program of acquisition on suburban campus together with the University's other suburban campus which is the Brunswick campus.

Architecture 
The building introduces a bold textural and planning concept to an unremarkable outer suburban campus. The arc read as a metallic fuselage, while in an ironic twist, the rock textured concrete abutments are perforated with circular windows. The educational building is a formal reflections on texture, tectonics, and colour as expressed through a building skin.

Award 
1998 - RAIA, National Awards, Sir Zelman Cowen Award for Public Buildings, Commendation

References 
Philip Goad: New Directions In Australian Architecture

Building 220
Buildings and structures completed in 1998
1998 establishments in Australia
Buildings and structures in the City of Whittlesea